In mathematics, a Cauchy-continuous, or Cauchy-regular, function is a special kind of continuous function between metric spaces (or more general spaces). Cauchy-continuous functions have the useful property that they can always be (uniquely) extended to the Cauchy completion of their domain.

Definition 

Properties 

Every uniformly continuous function is also Cauchy-continuous. Conversely, if the domain  is totally bounded, then every Cauchy-continuous function is uniformly continuous.

Every Cauchy-continuous function is continuous. Conversely, if the domain  is complete, then every continuous function is Cauchy-continuous.

Examples and non-examples 

On the subspace  of rational numbers, however, matters are different. For a non-uniform example on  let  be ; this is not uniformly continuous (on all of ), but it is Cauchy-continuous. (This example works equally well on )

Generalizations 

Cauchy continuity makes sense in situations more general than metric spaces, but then one must move from sequences to nets (or equivalently filters). The definition above applies, as long as the Cauchy sequence  is replaced with an arbitrary Cauchy net. Equivalently, a function  is Cauchy-continuous if and only if, given any Cauchy filter  on  then  is a Cauchy filter base on  This definition agrees with the above on metric spaces, but it also works for uniform spaces and, most generally, for Cauchy spaces.

Any directed set  may be made into a Cauchy space. (This generalizes the example of sequences above, where 0 is to be interpreted as )

See also 

 
 Heine–Cantor theorem

References 

 Eva Lowen-Colebunders (1989). Function Classes of Cauchy Continuous Maps. Dekker, New York.

Topology
Types of functions